The Southern Harmony and Musical Companion is the second studio album by American rock band the Black Crowes, released on May 12, 1992. It was the first album by the band to feature Marc Ford on lead guitar, replacing Jeff Cease, who was fired the year before, and the first to feature keyboardist Eddie Harsch. The album's name derives from the full name of the Southern Harmony, an influential 1835 hymnal compiled by William Walker.

Release 
It was a record for an album to feature four album rock number-one hits (previously set by Tom Petty in 1989, with three). The album itself reached the top spot of the Billboard 200 album chart, propelled by the success of these singles.

Reception
In 2005, The Southern Harmony and Musical Companion was ranked number 477 in Rock Hard magazine's book The 500 Greatest Rock & Metal Albums of All Time.

In 2006, the album was ranked number 100 on Guitar World magazine's list of the greatest 100 guitar albums of all time.

Track listing

Personnel 
The Black Crowes

Chris Robinson – vocals, percussion, blues harp, guitar 
Rich Robinson – guitar
Marc Ford – guitar
Johnny Colt – bass guitar
Steve Gorman – drums
Eddie Harsch – keyboards

Additional musicians

 Chris Trujillo – congas
 Barbara Mitchell and Taj Harmon (now Taj Artis) – choir

Production

Pete Angelus – personal manager
The Black Crowes – producer
George Drakoulias – producer
Janet Levinson – art direction
Brendan O'Brien – engineer, mixing
Chris Robinson – art direction
 Mark Seliger – photography
 Howie Weinberg - mastering

Charts

Weekly charts

Year-end charts

Certifications

References

The Black Crowes albums
1992 albums
Albums produced by George Drakoulias